Simon Xu Hui Shen is a Hong Kong political scientist and columnist.

Education
Shen was educated at the Queen's College and graduated from the Yale University in 2000 with bachelor's degrees in Political Science and History and later master's in Political Science. He obtained a doctoral degree from the Department of Politics and International Relations, University of Oxford in 2006. His thesis is titled "A New Stability in China's Internal and External Affairs? Reinventing Chinese Nationalism in Sino-American Relations (1999-2003)".

Academic career
Shen joined Chinese University of Hong Kong (CUHK) in 2003 and became research assistant professor in the Hong Kong Institute of Asia-Pacific Studies of the same university. In 2009, he was invited by Anthony Cheung, then President of Hong Kong Institute of Education (now Education University of Hong Kong) to its Faculty of Arts and Sciences. He returned to CUHK in 2012.

He held visiting positions in Brookings Institution, University of Warwick and National University of Singapore.

In 2016, he left his hometown. Within three years, he returned to Hong Kong but has since then left again in exile in the wake of the implementation of the national security law in 2020.

Works
Books
  (Co-edited with Jean-Marc Blanchard)
  (Co-edited with Shaun Breslin and Carla Freeman)
  (Co-edited with Jean-Marc Blanchard)
  (Co-edited with Shaun Breslin)

References

Living people
Hong Kong political scientists
Scholars of diplomacy
Alumni of Queen's College, Hong Kong
Yale College alumni
Alumni of the University of Oxford
Hong Kong expatriates in Taiwan
Year of birth missing (living people)